Nida Sinnokrot (1971) is a Palestinian-American artist, focusing on installation art, and filmmaker. Raised in Algeria, Sinnokrot relocated to the United States as an adolescent.

In 2002, he won a Rockefeller Film/Video/Multimedia Fellowship for his 'horizontal cinema' work. Subsequently, he directed an award-winning documentary called Palestine Blues, 'a disappearing landscape film'.

Nida Sinnokrot’s work employs a variety of mediums to transform ordinary objects or actions into sensory experiences that reveal a complexity of form and perception trapped within the mundane. Nida received his BA from the University of Texas at Austin and an MFA from Bard College. In 2001 he participated the Whitney Museum of American Art Independent Study Program. He is a Rockefeller Foundation Media Arts Fellow (2002) and a Fellow of Akademie Schloss Solitude (2012–15) and has received support from the Merz Akademie among others.

His works has featured in exhibitions including the Sharjah Biennial 13 (2017); Taipei Biennial, Taiwan (2016); Witte de With Center
for Contemporary Art, Rotterdam, Netherlands (2015); Tea with Nefertiti, Institut du Monde Arabe, Paris; Biennale Cuvée, World
Selection of Contemporary Art, Linz, Austria (2010); Sharjah Biennial 9 (2009); and When Artists Say We, Artists Space, New York (2006).

Nida’s recent solo shows include Exquisite Rotation at KIOSK in Ghent (2018) which brought together cinematic installations and
sculptural works spanning 20yrs, and Expand Extract Repent Repeat at Carlier | Gebauer in Berlin (2018-2019) which presents recent
sculpture, photographs, and installation works that reference flows of global capital, the writing and rewriting of history, and cycles of
debt. Nida’s work is in various public collections including the Sharjah Art Foundation, Sharjah, United Arab Emirates and the
Khalid Shoman Foundation, Amman, Jordan.

Nida has taught at Al-Quds Bard Honors College for Liberal Arts and Sciences in East Jerusalem and is currently an assistant professor in MIT’s Art, Culture and Technology Program (ACT) in Cambridge, Massachusetts.

External links
 Nida Sinnokrot: A Palestinian Filmmaker’s Story of the Wall
 Made in Palestine, Nida Sinnokrot
  Nida Sinnokrot, Institute for Middle East Understanding
 Palestine Blues official site
 Jonah’s Whale Installation at St. Peter Church in Cologne Germany, Dec 12, 2019
 University  of Texas official site
 Bard University official site
 Whitney Collection Research
 Rockefeller Foundation annual report
 University official site
 Sharjah Biennale
 Taipei Biennale
 Festival official site
 Tea with Nefertiti
 Triennale official site
 Festival official site
 Artists Space exhibition
 Nida Sinnokrot exhibition at KIOSK
 Current Expand Extract
 Sharjah Art Foundation
 Khalid Shoman Foundation
 Bard University alumni
 MIT university official site

References 

Living people
American people of Palestinian descent
1971 births